Lithoglyptidae is a family of barnacles in the order Lithoglyptida. There are about 7 genera and more than 40 described species in Lithoglyptidae.

Genera
These genera belong to the family Lithoglyptidae:
 Auritoglyptes Kolbasov & Newman, 2005
 Balanodytes Utinomi, 1950
 Berndtia Utinomi, 1950
 Kochlorine Noll, 1872
 Kochlorinopsis Stubbings, 1967
 Lithoglyptes Aurivillius, 1892
 Weltneria Berndt, 1907

References

Crustacean families